Acronicta concrepta is a moth of the family Noctuidae. It is found in the Korean Peninsula, China, Japan (Hokkaido), the Russian Far East (Primorye, Khabarovsk, Amur region, Sakhalin, southern Kuriles) and south-eastern Siberia (Transbaikalia).

External links
Korean Insects

Acronicta
Moths of Asia
Moths described in 1937